The New York Rock and Soul Revue: Live at the Beacon is a live album which documented the New York Rock and Soul Revue.  It was recorded on March 1 and 2, 1991 at the Beacon Theatre in New York City, a favorite venue of organizer Donald Fagen. The performances featured Fagen and included Phoebe Snow, Michael McDonald, Boz Scaggs, Eddie Brigati, David Brigati and Charles Brown. Selections on the album included a number of songs which were originally written and recorded by members of the revue, as well as other songs. The album was released by Giant Records.

Reception

In his Allmusic review, William Ruhlman wrote "Of course, it would have been better to have been there, but this makes an entertaining souvenir."

Track listing

Personnel 
 Donald Fagen – vocals, acoustic piano, Fender Rhodes, melodica (4, 11)
 Charles Brown – vocals, acoustic piano
 Michael McDonald – vocals, Yamaha DX7
 Jeff Young – keyboards, organ solo (3)
 Danny Caron – guitar
 Jimmy Vivino – guitar
 Larry DeBari – guitar (5)
 Drew Zingg – guitar (8, 10, 12)
 Lincoln Schleifer – electric bass, acoustic bass
 Dennis McDermott – drums
 Philip Hamilton – percussion, backing vocals
 David Brigati – percussion, vocals, birdcalls (11)
 Eddie Brigati – percussion, vocals
 Cornelius Bumpus – tenor saxophone (1, 6, 10, 12)
 John Hagen – tenor saxophone
 Chris Anderson – trumpet (2, 10)
 Bob Gurland – vocal trumpet (10)
 Mindy Jostyn – harmonica (11), backing vocals
 Boz Scaggs – vocals
 Phoebe Snow – vocals
 Jeff Young & The Youngsters – vocals
 Dian Sorel – backing vocals
 Ula Hedwig – backing vocals

Production 
 Recorded by Elliot Scheiner and  David Hewitt 
 Remote Recording Services' Silver Truck

References

1992 live albums
Giant Records (Warner) live albums
Donald Fagen albums
Albums produced by Donald Fagen
Collaborative albums
Live rock albums
Live soul albums